Starczewo  may refer to the following places in Poland:
 Starczewo, Kuyavian-Pomeranian Voivodeship
 Starczewo, Lubusz Voivodeship
 Starczewo-Pobodze
 Starczewo Wielkie